Meyah Romeo (born 2 August 1997) is an American-raised Trinidadian footballer who plays as a centre back for the Trinidad and Tobago women's national team.

International career
Romeo played for Trinidad and Tobago at senior level in the 2020 CONCACAF Women's Olympic Qualifying Championship qualification.

References

External links

1997 births
Living people
Women's association football central defenders
Trinidad and Tobago women's footballers
Trinidad and Tobago women's international footballers
Trinidad and Tobago emigrants to the United States
People with acquired American citizenship
American women's soccer players
Sportspeople from Queens, New York
Soccer players from New York City
People from St. Albans, Queens
African-American women's soccer players
College women's soccer players in the United States
Queens Knights athletes
21st-century African-American sportspeople
21st-century African-American women